Knowlton Hall, located in Columbus, Ohio, United States, is the current home for the three disciplines that comprise the Austin E. Knowlton School of Architecture (KSA) at The Ohio State University. The building was completed in 2004. The School of Architecture offers both undergraduate and graduate degrees in the fields of Architecture, Landscape Architecture, and City and Regional Planning. Knowlton Hall serves as the replacement for Ives Hall, the previous home of the school of architecture which was demolished in July 2002. The namesake of Knowlton Hall is Austin E. "Dutch" Knowlton. He graduated from The Ohio State University in 1931 with a Bachelor's in Architectural Engineering and provided a $10 million donation that spearheaded the funding for the creation of the building.

Architecture 

Initially, the brief for the building was to renovate the existing building, Ives Hall, and plan an addition to accommodate anticipated programming. As the architect, Mack Scogin Merrill Elam Architects, worked, they realized it would be better to build anew with the primary goal of the building to inspire its students.

The structure is post-tensioned concrete construction and white Georgia marble as stipulated by the donor. The marble was used as shingles in a rainscreen that could be easily replaced and allow light inside.

The resulting building form is monumental with enclosing, defining, and confronting space and adjacent buildings with a sense of elegance reflected in its green space. Designed by Michael Van Valkenburgh Associates, the landscape attempts to increase nature on the site through landform strips around the building's perimeter and construction of an arboreal bosque.

Design and organization
Knowlton Hall houses a 30,000 volume library, 65 offices, 45 studio spaces, a workshop, its own café, and a large auditorium that serves not only as one of the six classrooms in Knowlton but also as a stage for the KSA lecture series.  The KSA lecture series bring students into close contact with prominent researchers and practitioners of architecture, landscape architecture, and city planning. As one member of an award jury for the American Institute of Architects (AIA) said in regards to Knowlton Hall:

What architect would not have liked to have gone to school here? This project embodies everything I would want in an architecture building. It is full of unique spaces, an open flexible hall that beckons people to participate, and seems to have surprises around every corner. 'Our buildings shape us,' as Churchill said, and to have future generations of architects learn and grow as designers within an inspiring building such as this ... is exhilarating.

Recognition
Since its completion in 2004, Knowlton Hall has been the subject of a lot of attention, not only within the local community of Columbus but also nationally. Knowlton Hall has gained recognition by national publications, such as Architecture, Competitions, Dwell, Praxis, and Architectural Record, and has also been the recipient of numerous awards:
 American Institute of Architects, National; Architecture Honor Award, 2010
 American Institute of Architects/American Library Association; Award of Excellence, 2005
 American Institute of Architects, Georgia; Honor Award, 2006
 American Institute of Architects, Ohio; Honor Award, 2005
 American Institute of Architects, Columbus; Honor Award, 2009
 American Council of Engineering Companies; National Recognition Award, 2005
 American Council of Engineering Companies, Ohio; Grand Award, 2005
 "International Masonry Institute", Ohio; Golden Trowel Award, 2005
 Post Tensioning Institute; Award of Excellence, 2004
 Columbus Landmarks; James B. Recchie Design Award, Finalist, 2007

Publications 
Todd Gannon, Margaret Fletcher, Teresa Ball (eds), Mack Scogin Merrill Elam: Knowlton Hall, Columbus, Ohio, Springer Science & Business Media, 2007

References

Buildings and structures completed in 2004
Ohio State University
Buildings and structures in Columbus, Ohio
Ohio State University buildings